Hollie may refer to:

People
Hollie Arnold (born 1994), British parasport athlete
 Hollie Doyle (born 1996), a British jockey
 Hollie Dykes (born 1990), an Australian gymnast
 Hollie Grima (born 1983), an Australian basketball player
 Hollie Smith (born 1982), a New Zealand jazz and soul singer
 Hollie Steel (born 1998), a British singer
 Hollie-Jay Bowes (born 1989), an English actress

Entertainment
 Hollie (album), the debut album by Hollie Steel
 The Hollies, an English rock group
 Hollies (1965 album), an album by The Hollies

See also
 Holly (disambiguation)
 Hollies (disambiguation)